Bulgarian conjugation is the creation of derived forms of a Bulgarian verb from its principal parts by inflection. It is affected by person, number, gender, tense, mood and voice. Bulgarian verbs are conventionally divided into three conjugations according to the thematic vowel they use in the present tense:
 1st conjugation: verbs using the vowel е (/ɛ/).
 2nd conjugation: verbs using the vowel и (/i/).
 3rd conjugation: athematic verbs, stems end in а or я.

In a dictionary, Bulgarian verbs are listed with their first-person-singular-present-tense form, due to the lack of an infinitive. This form is called the citation form.

Bulgarian verbs are conjugated using the formula:

where thematic vowel and inflection suffix are only optional. The stem of the verb is what is left of the citation form after removing its final letter. Sometimes in the course of conjugation, the stem may undergo some alterations. In this article, any alteration of the stem is coloured in blue, the thematic vowels are coloured in red, and the inflectional endings in green.

Inflectional suffixes

Personal endings
Below are the endings for all finite forms:

1 When unstressed.

2 When stressed.

3 Only some irregular first conjugation verbs.

Non-finite form endings
These are the endings for the non-finite forms:

Thematic vowels
Below is a table of the thematic vowels. They are inserted between the stem and the ending.

Finite forms

Present Tense

First conjugation
Verbs from the first conjugation use the thematic vowel е (/ɛ/) between the stem and the personal endings, except in first person singular and third person plural, where the endings are added directly to the stem.

All verbs with citation forms ending in а use the endings -а and -ат in first person singular and third person plural respectively.

* Notice that the endings -а and -ат when stressed are pronounced /ɤ/ and /ɤt̪/, not /a/, /at̪/.

All verbs with stems ending in a vowel use the endings -я and -ят in first person singular and third person plural respectively.

All verbs with citation forms ending in я also use the endings -я and -ят in first person singular and third person plural.

All verbs with stems ending in -к (/k/) or -г (/g/) change to -ч (/tʃ/) and -ж (/ʒ/) respectively, before the thematic vowel е. This change is not limited solely to the present tense and happens always before /i/, /ɛ/ and the yat vowel.

Second conjugation
Verbs from the second conjugation use the thematic vowel и (/i/) between the stem and the personal endings, except in first person singular and third person plural, where the endings are added directly to the stem.

All verbs with stems not ending in -ж (/ʒ/), -ч (/tʃ/) or -ш (/ʃ/) use the endings -я and -ят in first person singular and third person plural.

* Notice that the endings -я and -ят when stressed are pronounced /jɤ/ and /jɤt̪/, not /ja/, /jat̪/.

All verbs with stems ending in -ж (/ʒ/), -ч (/tʃ/) or -ш (/ʃ/) use the endings -а and -ат in first person singular and third person plural.

* Notice that the endings -а and -ат when stressed are pronounced /ɤ/ and /ɤt̪/, not /a/, /at̪/.

Third conjugation
Strictly speaking, verbs from the third conjugation are athematic, because the personal endings are added directly to the stem with no thematic vowel in between. It may seem that the vowel а (/ə/) is inserted between them, but that vowel is actually part of the stem. All verbs have stems ending in either а or я.

Past Imperfect
The past imperfect always follows the stress patterns of the present tense.

First and second conjugation
These verbs use the old yat vowel between the stem and the personal endings. When stressed, it is pronounced as /ja/ (written я) or /a/ (written а) after /ʒ/, /tʃ/ and /ʃ/. When unstressed, it is pronounced as /ɛ/ (written е). In second and third person singular it is always pronounced as /ɛ/.

* The consonants к (/k/) and г (/g/) change to ч (/tʃ/) and ж (/ʒ/) before the front vowels е (/ɛ/) and и (/i/).

Additionally, after ж (/ʒ/), ч (/tʃ/) and ш (/ʃ/) the stressed yat vowel can be pronounced either as /a/ (as above) or as /ɛ/. The latter forms have fallen largely into disuse.

Third conjugation
Verbs from the third conjugation use no thematic vowel, the endings are added directly to the stem.

Past Aorist
In the first and second conjugation, verbs are additionally divided into classes according to the thematic vowel they use. In the third conjugation, verbs are divided into classes according to the final vowel of the stem.

Stress
Verbs with stress on the stem can keep it there or move it to the thematic vowel (or the final vowel of the stem in the case of the athematic third conjugation verbs). However, this shift can only happen if the verb is unprefixed or if it is imperfective. Forms with unshifted stress are usually typical for the eastern dialects and forms with shifted stress for the western dialects. However, the latter forms have become stylistically marked as dialectal and should be avoided and used only to distinguish otherwise homonymous forms.

Prefixed perfective verbs with stress on the stem do not change it.

Verbs with stress on the thematic vowel keep it there with the exception of first conjugation verbs of the first class and a few others.

First conjugation

First class
These verbs have the vowel о (/o̝/) or е (/ɛ/) in second and third person singular between the stem and the personal endings. The stems of these verbs end in д (/d̪/), т (/t̪/), с (/s/), з (/z/) and к (/k/). This class contains only 23 main verbs, which, however, are some of the most frequently used and there are hundreds of prefixed verbs formed from them:

бодá, (съ-)блекá, бъ́да*, (до-)ведá, влекá, дам*, до́йда*, кладá, крадá, (в-)ля́за, метá, (в-)несá, пасá, пекá, плетá, предá, растá*, рекá, секá, текá, тресá, четá, ям*
*These verbs are irregular but are considered part of the first class because in the aorist they behave just like the regular ones.

Although the stem of the verb тъка ends in к (/k/), it is not part of this class, it belongs to the next one.

An important feature of regular verbs from the first class is that the stress always moves on the last syllable of the stem (unless it is already there). This stress position is kept in the past active aorist participle, the past passive participle and the verbal noun.

* The consonant к (/k/) changes to ч (/tʃ/) before the front vowel е (/ɛ/).

The verbs (съ-)блекá, влекá, (в-)ля́за and секá have the old yat vowel in the stem, which alternates between я (/ja/) and е (/ɛ/) according to the pronunciation in the eastern dialects.

Second class
These verbs use the thematic vowel а (/a/ or /ə/) between the stem and the personal endings. The stems of these verbs end in a consonant different from ж /ʒ/, ч /tʃ/, ш /ʃ/, д (/d̪/), т (/t̪/), с (/s/), з (/z/) or к (/k/), and their citation forms end in а. This class contains over 400 main verbs.

* Notice the stress shift as mentioned above.

Stems ending in -ер (/ɛr/), such as бера, пера and дера, lose the е (/ɛ/):

In the verbs греба and гриза the stress moves to the stem. This is so because they used to belong to the first class.

Third class
These verbs also use the thematic vowel а (/a/ or /ə/). This class is almost identical to the previous one, the only difference is that the citation form ends in я. It contains 23 main verbs:

бъ́бля*, бъ́бря*, бъ́хтя*, дре́мя, дъ́дря*, зо́бя*, ка́пя, кле́пя*, къ́кря*, къ́пя, мъ́мля*, мъ́мря*, пъ́пля*, си́пя, ску́бя, трепе́ря*, тре́пя, тъ́тря*, фъ́фля*, ха́пя, хъ́хря*, цъ́цря*, щипя

* These verbs have moved to the first class of the second conjugation due to analogy. First-conjugation forms can still be found, but are considered old-fashioned.

* Notice the stress shift as mentioned above.

The verb дремя contains the yat vowel which alternates between я (/ja/) and е (/ɛ/):

Fourth class
These verbs use the vowel а (/a/ or /ə/) between the stem and the personal endings. The stems of these verbs end in one of the consonants ж /ʒ/, ч /tʃ/ or ш /ʃ/, which in the aorist change to з/г (/z,g/), k (/k/) and с (/s/) respectively. This class contains 27 main verbs:

Change from /ʒ/ to /z/: бли́жа, въ́ржа, ка́жа, ли́жа, ма́жа, ни́жа, ре́жа, хари́жа
Change from /ʒ/ to /g/: лъ́жа, стри́жа, стъ́ржа
Change from /tʃ/ to /k/: ба́уча, дъ́вча, мя́уча, пла́ча, сму́ча, су́ча, тъ́пча
Change from /ʃ/ to /s/: бри́ша, бъ́рша, мири́ша, (о-)па́ша, пи́ша, ре́ша*, уйди́ша, уйдурди́ша, че́ша

* реша also belongs to the second conjugation.

* Notice the stress shift as mentioned above.

The verb режа has the yat vowel, which alternates between я (/ja/) and е (/ɛ/).

The verbs глождя (глозгах), дращя (драсках) and пощя (посках) used to belong to this class but now have completely migrated to the second conjugation.

Fifth class
This class uses the yat vowel between the stem and the personal endings. It is consistently pronounced as я (/ja/) in all forms. The stems of these verbs end in a consonant + р (/r/), except for the defective verb ща. This is the smallest class, containing only 6 main verbs:

вра, зра, мра, (с-)пра́, простра́, ща

Sixth class
This class uses the thematic vowel я (/ja/ or /jə/). The class contains a small number of verbs, whose stems end in the vowels а (/a/) or е (/ɛ/):

але́я, ба́я, бле́я, ва́я, ве́я, зе́я, зна́я*, ка́я се, (на-)кле́я, кре́я, ла́я, ма́я се, наде́я се, неха́я, отча́я се, ре́я се, тра́я, шля́я се

* Verbs derived from зная by prefixation belong to the seventh class.

Some verbs belong both to this and to the next class. Some examples are: вея, блея, рея, шляя се, etc.

* Notice the stress shift as mentioned above.

Seventh class
These verbs do not use any thematic vowel. The personal endings are added directly to the stem, which almost always ends in a vowel, either а (/a/), я (/ja/), е (/ɛ/), и (/i/), у (/u/) or ю (/ju/). This class contains over 250 main verbs, some of which are:

Stems in /a/ or /ja/ : веща́я, вита́я, влия́я, гада́я, жела́я, (по-)зна́я, игра́я, копа́я, мечта́я, обеща́я, сия́я, скуча́я, четра́я, etc.
Stems in /ɛ/ : венче́я, възмъже́я, върше́я, гре́я, дебеле́я, живе́я, ле́я, пе́я, се́я, тъмне́я, etc.
Stems in /i/ (only 9 main verbs) :  би́я, ви́я, гни́я, кри́я, ми́я, пи́я, ри́я, три́я, ши́я.
Stems in /u/ or /ju/ (only 6 main verbs) : (на-)ду́я, плу́я, плю́я, (об-)у́я, (на-)хлу́я, чу́я.

All stems ending in /ɛ/ actually end in the old yat vowel which is pronounced as я (/ja/) or а (/a/) after /ʒ/, /tʃ/ and /ʃ/ in all aorist forms.

Stems ending in -ем (/ɛm/) are also considered to belong in this class since they do not use a thematic vowel. They are a special case because the stem loses the м (/m/) before adding the personal endings.

Second conjugation

First class
These verbs use the vowel и (/i/) between the stem and the personal endings. There are both stems ending in a consonant and stems ending in a vowel. The vast majority of the verbs from second conjugation belong to this class.

* Notice the double stress pattern as mentioned above.

Second class
These verbs use the old yat vowel between the stem and the personal endings. It is consistently pronounces as я (/ja/) in all forms. The majority of the stems end in a consonant (different from ж /ʒ/, ч /tʃ/ or ш /ʃ/) but there a few ending in a vowel. These verbs are characterized by the fact that the stress always falls on the thematic vowel across all forms, not exclusively in the aorist. This class contains 76 main verbs.

Third class
These verbs use the vowel а (/a/) between the personal endings and the stem, which always ends in ж /ʒ/ or ч /tʃ/. The stress is always on the thematic vowel in all forms, just as in the previous class. The class contains 27 main verbs:
бръмча́, буча́, гълча́, гъмжа́, дрънча́, държа́, еча́, жужа́, журча́, звуча́, квича́, клеча́, лежа́, лича́, мижа́, муча́, мълча́, руча́, ръмжа́, стърча́, тежа́, търча́, фуча́, хвърча́, хуча́, цвърча́.

Third conjugation
All verbs conjugate in the same fashion (without a thematic vowel, simply by adding the personal endings directly to the stem), nevertheless, Bulgarian grammar books divide them into two classes, depending on the final vowel of the stem.

First class
These are stems ending in а (/a/). The vast majority of third conjugation verbs belong to this class.

* Notice the stress shift as explained above.

Second class
The stems of these verbs end in я (/ja/). This class is much smaller compared to the first one.

* Notice the stress shift as explained above.

Imperative mood
Inflected imperative forms exist only for the second person. The other persons use periphrastic constructions. All regular verbs, regardless of conjugation, form the imperative mood in the same way:
Stems ending in a vowel (which include all third-conjugation verbs) use the thematic (semi)vowel й (/j/) between the stem and the personal endings. These verbs usually do not have a stress shift, they keep the stress of the present tense, unless it is on the thematic vowel, in which case it moves on the preceding syllable, since /j/ is not a vowel and cannot be stressed.
Stems ending in a consonant use the thematic vowel и (/i/) in the singular form and the vowel е (/ɛ/) in the plural form. The stress is always on the thematic vowel.

Some verbs, most notably stems ending in з (/z/) from the first class of the first conjugation, and a few other frequently used ones, use only the bare stem without a thematic vowel:

* The yat vowel changes to е (/ɛ/).

Non-finite forms

Present Active Participle
Only imperfective verbs have a present active participle. It is formed from the first-person-singular-past-imperfect form of the verb by removing the final х (/x/) and adding щ (/ʃt̪/). It is inflected as a regular adjective (see the endings).

* Although the yat vowel is followed by a syllable containing и (/i/), it is not pronounced as е (/ɛ/).

Past Active Aorist Participle
It is formed from the first-person-singular-past-aorist form of the verb by removing the final х (/x/) and adding л (/ɫ/), after that it is inflected as an adjective (see the endings). Only verbs from the first class of the first conjugation form it somewhat differently: the thematic vowel о (/o̝/) is removed and the л (/ɫ/) is added directly to the stem with some additional changes, namely:
Stems ending in д (/d̪/) and т (/t̪/) lose them;
Stems ending in с (/s/), з (/z/) and к (/k/) have an epenthetic ъ (/ə/) between the stem and the л (/ɫ/) in the masculine indefinite form (it is absent in all the other forms).

The past active aorist participle keeps the stress of the past aorist, either shifted or not.

1 Since the yat vowel is followed by a syllable containing и (/i/) it is pronounced as е (/ɛ/).

2 Although the yat vowel is followed by a syllable containing и (/i/), it is not pronounced as е (/ɛ/).

Past Active Imperfect Participle
It is formed from the first-person-singular-past-imperfect form of the verb by removing the final х (/x/) and adding л (/ɫ/). It is inflected as a regular adjective, but without definite forms, since it is never used as an actual adjective, but only in certain verbal constructions (see the endings).

1 Since the yat vowel is followed by a syllable containing и (/i/) it is pronounced as е (/ɛ/).

2 Although the yat vowel is followed by a syllable containing и (/i/), it is not pronounced as е (/ɛ/).

Past Passive Participle
Only transitive verbs have a past passive participle. It is formed from the first-person-singular-past-aorist form of the verb by removing the final х (/x/) and adding н (/n/) or т (/t̪/), after that it is inflected as an adjective (see the endings). Verbs from the first class of the first conjugation and the first class of the second conjugation change the thematic vowel of the past aorist to е (/ɛ/).

The vast majority of the verbs use the ending н (/n/), only some verbs from the first conjugation use т (/t̪/), namely all verbs with stems ending in н (/n/) from the second class, and a few verbs from the seventh class (all stems ending in /i/, /u/, /ju/, /ɛm/ and a few others). Some verbs from the seventh class can use both endings.

Although the past passive participle is formed from the past aorist, it does not have a stress shift, it always keeps the stress of the present tense, except for first conjugation verbs from the first class, and the verbs греба and гриза which used to belong to the first class.

1 Notice that the thematic vowel о (/o̝/) is changed to е (/ɛ/).

2 The consonant к (/k/) changes to ч (/tʃ/) before the front vowel е (/ɛ/).

3 Since the yat vowel is followed by a syllable containing и (/i/) it is pronounced as е (/ɛ/).

4 Notice that there is no stress shift, unlike the past aorist and the past active aorist participle.

5 Notice that the thematic vowel и (/i/) is changed to е (/ɛ/).

Adverbial Participle
Only imperfective verbs have an adverbial participle. Verbs from the first and second conjugation use the thematic vowel е (/ɛ/) between the stem and the ending -йки (/jkʲi/). Verbs from the third conjugation just add the ending without using a thematic vowel. This participle is immutable.

The adverbial participle keeps the stress of the present tense.

Verbal Noun
Only imperfective verbs have a verbal noun. It is formed either from the first-person-singular-past-imperfect or -past aorist form of the verb (or from both). The final х (/x/) is removed and the ending не (/nɛ/) is added. After that it is inflected as neuter noun (see the endings). If the thematic vowel is о (/o̝/), и (/i/) or the yat vowel, it is changed to е (/ɛ/) before adding the ending.

Stems ending in н (/n/) from the second class of the first conjugation, and stems ending in е (/ɛ/), и (/i/), у (/u/) and ю (/ju/) from the seventh class use only the past imperfect to form the verbal noun. All verbs from the first class of the second conjugation use only the past aorist. The remaining verbs may use only the past aorist, only the past imperfect or both. This is not determined by which conjugation or class a verb belongs to, it is an inherent characteristic of each verb.

When the verbal noun is formed from the past aorist, it does not have a stress shift, it usually keeps the stress of the present tense, except for first-conjugation verbs from the first class, and a few other verbs which move the stress further back on the ending.

1 Notice that the thematic vowel о (/o̝/) is changed to е (/ɛ/).

3 Since the yat vowel is followed by a syllable containing е (/ɛ/), it is pronounced as е (/ɛ/).

3 Since both the vowel о (/o̝/) and the yat vowel are changed to е (/ɛ/), the two forms of the verbal noun are written the same, but pronounced differently, they differ by stress position.

4 Notice that the stress is on the ending.

5 Notice that there is no stress shift, just like the past passive participle and unlike the past aorist and the past active aorist participle.

6 Notice that the thematic vowel и (/i/) is changed to е (/ɛ/).

7 Since the past aorist and imperfect forms are identical the two forms of the verbal noun are also identical.

Bibliography
 Bulgarian Academy of Sciences, Institute of Bulgarian Language (1983) Граматика на съвременния български книжовен език. Том 2. Морфология

Bulgarian grammar
Indo-European verbs